Nullsoft Streaming Video (NSV) was a media container designed for streaming video content over the Internet. NSV was developed by Nullsoft, the makers of Winamp.

The NSV format is another example of streaming video formats, offered by various companies and media players. Windows Media, QuickTime File Format and RealMedia streams are just a few examples of these, and each have their benefits and shortcomings. NSV, by default configuration, used MP3 as its standard audio format, with VP3 as the video format. Various hacks and codec installations allowed NSV to use Ogg Vorbis for audio and later updates of the VP codecs for video.

One of the shortfalls of most streaming formats often comes from the difficulty in finding streams, or at least some form of directory service; and in some cases, none are readily available to the public at all. With Nullsoft's SHOUTcast service, a media streaming and directory system, the NSV format became popular, along with SHOUTcast's listings of Streaming Audio, which reach well into the thousands. The "Media Library" offers integrated listings of both audio and video streams, returned directly from the SHOUTcast service.

With Nullsoft's sale to Radionomy in 2014, NSV is no longer supported.

The freeware player VLC can be used to convert NSV files into standard video and audio formats like mp4 or mp3.

History

NSV was created in late 2002/early 2003 by Justin Frankel while working at Nullsoft.
Originally designed as a demonstration of the potential that newly developed streaming technology Ultravox could offer, it later became an accepted format for AOL streaming media, with many promotional videos available on both Winamp.com and the AOL website.

Players
Current media players that support the Nullsoft Video format are:

 GoodPlayer for iOS
 K-Multimedia Player
 MoboPlayer for Android
 MPlayer
 RealPlayer Plug-In - http://rnsv.hit.bg
 RockPlayer 1.x for Android (not RockPlayer2)
 VLC (with VP6 support since 0.8.6, can also convert)
 Winamp
 Xine
 mpv

External links
www.nullsoft.com - Official Nullsoft Video Software Download Site
forums.winamp.com/forumdisplay.php?forumid=152 - Official Nullsoft Video Forum
https://web.archive.org/web/20070223003813/http://ultravox.aol.com/NSVFormat.rtf - NSV Format specification and documentation
Sourceforge.net Project Page: Nsv Lib - Unofficial Open Source - cross Platform, in development NSV Library in C++
Nullsoft (Streaming|S as in Soft) Video Last version of the Nullsoft NSV Video Format website, with specifications and samples

Digital container formats
Streaming television
AOL